Leonidas C. Platanias is a Greek-American oncologist. He is the director of the Robert H. Lurie Comprehensive Cancer Center of Northwestern University and the Jesse, Sara, Andrew, Abigail, Benjamin and Elizabeth Lurie Professor of Oncology. He is internationally known for his research focused on cytokine signaling pathways in cancer cells, and for his contributions in developing therapies that target those pathways. 

Platanias also serves as associate vice president for Cancer Programs in Northwestern's Office for Research, professor of Medicine and of Biochemistry and Molecular Genetics at Northwestern University Feinberg School of Medicine, and as a medical oncologist who treats patients with leukemia and other blood cancers at Northwestern Medicine.

Early life and education
Born in Athens, Greece, Platanias earned his medical degree and Doctorate from the School of Medicine, University of Patras. While completing his degrees, Platanias' father was diagnosed with leukemia which resulted in him pursuing a career in oncology. Platanias moved to the United States in 1984 to begin his research career at the National Heart, Lung, and Blood Institute at the National Institutes of Health in Bethesda, Maryland, where he worked as a post-doctoral fellow on the pathogenesis and pathophysiology of aplastic anemia in the laboratory of Neal S. Young, chief of the Hematology Branch of the NIH. Following this, he completed a residency in internal medicine at the State University of New York, Downstate Medical Center in 1989, and a fellowship in hematology-oncology at the University of Chicago Hospitals in 1992. He is board certified in both Internal Medicine and Medical Oncology by the American Board of Internal Medicine.

Career
Platanias established his own laboratory working on cytokine signaling pathways in malignant cells in 1992 at Loyola University Chicago. Following this, he accepted an associate professor position at the University of Illinois Chicago (UIC) where he ultimately became a professor and Chief of the Division of Hematology-Oncology. In 2002, he was recruited to become the first deputy director of the Robert H. Lurie Comprehensive Cancer Center of Northwestern University and the Jesse, Sara, Andrew, Abigail, Benjamin, and Elizabeth Lurie Professor of Oncology. Platanias also served as president of the International Cytokine & Interferon Society from 2008 to 2009.  

During his tenure at Northwestern, Platanias continued his molecular biology and biochemistry research focused on signaling pathways in cancer cells. In 2013, his research team showed an ability to block the growth of primitive disease cells in acute myeloid leukemia while also enhancing the effects of chemotherapy. His laboratory also defined kinase elements as targets for the development of therapeutic approaches in myeloid leukemias. Among his career honors, Dr. Platanias received the prestigious 2013 Seymour & Vivian Milstein Award for Excellence in Interferon and Cytokine Research from the International Cytokine and Interferon Society. Following this, he was appointed the Interim Director of the Robert H. Lurie Comprehensive Cancer Center.

In 2014, Platanias was named Director of the Lurie Cancer Center. As director he oversees clinical operations as well as basic science research programs, including programs to translate basic. clinical and population science research into personalized medicine. In 2018, under Platanias' leadership, Lurie Cancer Center received the highest rating possible from the National Cancer Institute (NCI), an overall "exceptional," on the competitive renewal of its Cancer Center Support Grant (CCSG). He oversees the cancer program at Northwestern Memorial Hospital, Lurie Cancer Center's primary teaching affiliate, which is ranked #9 in the nation and recognized as the top cancer program in Illinois and Chicago by U.S. News & World Report in its 2021-2022 list of "Best Hospitals for Cancer." 

While serving as director of the Lurie Cancer Center, Platanias received the 2019 Academy of Achievement in Medicine Award from the American Hellenic Educational Progressive Association. He also helped discover a never-before-seen counterpart called cTORC to explain why cancer therapies targeting only mTORC have been unsuccessful. Platanias has published more than 330 papers and his efforts have been continuously funded by the NCI for nearly 30 years.

References

Living people
American oncologists
Greek oncologists
University of Patras alumni
Northwestern University faculty
Year of birth missing (living people)
Scientists from Athens